or  is a Latin legal phrase that loosely translates to "accident is felt by the owner". It means that it is the owner who has to assume the risk of accidental harm to him or accidental loss to his property. Taken more generally it connotes the foundational private law principle that it is the owner who has to bear the damage to his person or property and that he can seek redress from a third party only when there are specific grounds in law for his compensation. 

The brocard has been described as the basic principle of tort law and can be traced back to Ulpian.

Legal institution

Description and analysis 
The legal phrase or legal maxim  is a tenant of Roman private law and a key feature of most European civil law systems. It means that the owner has to carry the risk of any loss or harm that occurs accidentally to him or his property. The owner can seek redress only if a third party can legally be held liable for this damage. The primary avenue for redress being tort law.

From a societal point of view, the principle brings to mind that damage to person or property is locked in at the time the damage has occurred and that this damage cannot be undone later. If the owner is compensated by a third party and the status quo ante is restored, this is only to be achieved by taking away an equivalent amount from this third party and transferring it to the owner of the damaged good. This transfer can further increase the loss to society as transaction costs can occur.

In his analysis of the maxim, the scholar  has argued that the principle can be dissected into two parts: Firstly, it emphasises that an owner has to bear the damage to his property. Secondly, it highlights that whether the loss of the owner is final or whether he can take recourse against a third party requires a legal claim being available to him to compensate his loss.

Criticism 
 has from time-to-time been criticised as being a rule without tangible content. This criticism rests on the point that the legal maxim leaves unexplained when a loss is, in fact, accidental – and when it is not. In the 19th century, the leading German pantectist scholar Bernhard Windscheid, for example, argued that as a rule  is "unsustainable, useless and in such general form incorrect". A century later, C. J. Claassen wrote in his Dictionary of Legal Words and Phrases (Volume IV, Durban, 1977) that "[t]here is no general rule of law that . It is merely self evident platitude".

Andreas Wacke has, however, defended the principle and reasoned that while it and other legal brocards do "not state any rule of immediate practicability", they "inspire legal teaching" and "force commentators of codes to define the extent of application of such principles". Following Henri Roland and Laurent Boyer, he considers these brocards to be "guardians of eternity [...] more lasting than codifications".

History 
The principle  can be traced back to the Roman jurist Ulpian. In the Digests usually D. 50,17,23 is cited as the source for the principle. In the Codex Justinianus, C. 4,24,9 is commonly quoted.

The principle was known to Immanuel Kant, who discussed it in his 1784 .

Codifications and common law

Civil law 

The Austrian  last used the phrase  in a judgement in 2010. A variation of it is also found in Article 1105 of the Spanish :
In the Dutch Burgerlijk Wetboek, similar notions are codified in Article 8:543 Dutch Civil Code and Article 8:1004(2) Dutch Civil Code. The German  does, however, not contain a provision that explicitly codifies it.

Common law 
The Anglo-American Common law contains a similar idea, albeit not expressed in this Latin phrase. Oliver Wendell Holmes Jr. writes in his 1881 The Common Law:

Mixed legal sytems 
The principle has also been accepted in mixed legal systems like South Africa, which are based Roman-Dutch law. South African Appellate Division judge Toon van den Heever in a 1949 case compared the principle to lightning:

See also 
 List of Latin legal terms

Notes and references

Notes

Citations

Bibliography 
 
 
 
 
 
 
 
 
 

Brocards (law)